Frimley Park Hospital is a large general hospital in Frimley, Surrey. It is managed by Frimley Health NHS Foundation Trust, and houses a private wing.

History 
Frimley Park Hospital was opened to provide a full range of acute services to patients North East Hampshire and West Surrey in 1974. After Cambridge Military Hospital in Aldershot closed in 1996, the hospital was selected by the Ministry of Defence to host one of the Ministry of Defence Hospital Units.

The hospital was built with reinforced autoclaved aerated concrete beams which was the subject of a safety alert in 2019.  This may lead to the rebuilding of the hospital as a cheaper option than replacing the beams.  In 2022 it was announced that operating theatres would be taken out of use to allow for urgent work on their roofs. This would reduce the capacity for operations by around 2,000.  Emergency work would also affect its ability to admit elective patients to beds.  The reinforcement works, which are temporary, would cost £8.1 million in 2022-23, and around £10 million in subsequent years.

Notable births
Royal family:
 
 Lady Louise Mountbatten-Windsor  (born 2003) daughter of Prince Edward, Duke of Edinburgh and Sophie, Duchess of Edinburgh.
 Earl of Wessex (born 2007) son of Prince Edward, Duke of Edinburgh and Sophie, Duchess of Edinburgh.

Other notable births:
 Jonny Wilkinson (born 1979) Rugby Union World Cup winner 
 Boo and Walt Evans (born 2018) The twins of Chris Evans

Performance
After an inspection in August 2015 the hospital was one of only three in England rated "outstanding" by the Care Quality Commission.

In 2023 the hospital paid a £39 million settlement to a young girl who lost all four limbs after staff at the hospital failed to diagnose meningitis promptly. The trust admitted its errors in failing to diagnose meningitis despite red flags for meningitis and sepsis being present when the patient was first taken to hospital.

See also
 List of hospitals in England

References

External links
Official site

NHS hospitals in England
Hospitals in Surrey